A newspaper hawker, newsboy or newsie is a street vendor of newspapers without a fixed newsstand. Related jobs included paperboy, delivering newspapers to subscribers, and news butcher, selling papers on trains. Adults who sold newspapers from fixed newsstands were called newsdealers, and are not covered here. The hawkers sold only one newspaper, which usually appeared in several editions a day. A busy corner would have several hawkers, each representing one of the major newspapers. They might carry a poster board with giant headlines, provided by the newspaper. The downtown newsboy started fading out after 1920 when publishers began to emphasize home delivery. Teenage newsboys delivered papers on a daily basis for subscribers who paid them monthly. Hawkers typically purchased a bundle of 100 copies from a wholesaler, who in turn purchased them from the publisher. Legally every state considered the newsboys to be independent contractors, and not employees, so they generally were not subject to child labor laws.

In the United States they became an iconic image of youthful entrepreneurship. Famous Americans that had worked as newsboys included Bruce Barton, Ralph Bunche, Joe DiMaggio, Thomas Edison, Dwight Eisenhower, Sam Rayburn, Walter Reuther, David Sarnoff, Cardinal Spellman, Harry Truman and Mark Twain.

United States

Benjamin Franklin is sometimes called the "first American newsboy", as he helped deliver his brother's New England Courant in 1721. But the real beginning of the trade of newsboy comes in 1833, when the New York Sun started hiring vendors in New York City. At the time, newspapers were generally either picked up at the newspaper's office, sent by mail, or delivered by printers' apprentices or other employees. The Sun, by contrast, was not sold in stores or by subscription. Its publisher, Benjamin Day, recruited unemployed people using help-wanted notices to vend his newspaper. Instead of the adults he expected, his ad drew children: the first was the 10-year-old Irish immigrant Bernard Flaherty, who turned out to be a talented hawker—later a stage comedian—who would cry out the day's most sensational headlines: "Double Distilled Villainy"; "Cursed Effects of Drunkenness!"; "Awful Occurrence!"; "Infamous Affair!". These newsboys could either hawk to passersby on the street or establish subscription routes; many did both.

Newsboys' were not employees of the newspapers but rather purchased the papers from wholesalers in packets of 100 and peddled them as independent agents.  Unsold papers could not be returned. The newsboys typically earned around 30 cents a day and often worked until late at night. Cries of "Extra, extra!" were often heard into the morning hours as newsboys attempted to hawk every last paper.

Great Depression
The local delivery boy pulling a wagon or riding a bicycle while tossing the morning or evening paper onto the front porch was a product of the 1930s. Newspapers lost circulation and advertising as the economy went down, and needed to boost revenues and cut expenses. Starting in 1930, the International Circulation Managers' Association launched a national operation to show local newspaper managers how to boost home newspaper readership. They designed a prepackaged curriculum in door-to-door subscription marketing that taught newsboys new skills in scheduling time, handling money, keeping accounts, and—especially—presenting a winning salesman persona. This movement created the middle-class newspaper boy and permanently altered the relationship between teenage years and entrepreneurial enterprise. Circulation managers solved their problem: The teenage boys. They were still independent contractors rather than employees, but the circulation manager designed the routes and taught the boys how to collect and account for the subscription money. To inspire the young entrepreneurs, they created a distinctive gendered managerial philosophy of masculine guidance. It inspired the boys' entrepreneurship and stabilized their work habits while providing extra money for tight family budgets.

Critics and reformers
Newsboys were often seen as victims of poverty and delinquents in the making. In 1875 a popular writer found them a nuisance:
There are 10,000 children living on the streets of New York....The newsboys constitute an important division of this army of homeless children. You see them everywhere.... They rend the air and deafen you with their shrill cries. They surround you on the sidewalk and almost force you to buy their papers. They are ragged and dirty. Some have no coats, no shoes, and no hat.

In St. Louis, Missouri, in the first half of the 20th century, reformers and child savers saw the newsboys as potential victims of the dangers and temptations of the urban environment. They secured a law in 1903 which created the state's first juvenile courts with the ability to hear criminal cases involving minors.

In Cincinnati in 1919, charity workers found that a tenth of the teenage boys were news hawkers, and they earned only 20 cents a day. They were twice as likely to be delinquents, they gambled a great deal amongst themselves, and were often attacked by thugs from other newspapers. The recommendation was to replace newsboys under the age of 16 with crippled war veterans.

News butcher
"News butchers" worked on passenger railroads selling newspapers, candy, and cigars to the passengers. Thomas Edison was a news butcher in his youth, but he lost that job after he set a car on fire due to white phosphorus igniting in a chemistry set he had onboard. Walt Disney worked as news butcher on the Missouri Pacific Railway as a teenager, and his memories of that experience influenced his design of the Disneyland Railroad.

Ireland
Stephanie Rains examines the newsboy as a characteristic presence on Irish streets in the early twentieth century and also necessary last link in the chain of media production and distribution.  He was little touched by mechanization—the newspaper vending box came later. Publishers depended on boys as young as eleven years old to sell copies, especially in downtown areas.  Newsboys were very visible and audible figures on Irish city streets and were themselves the subject of frequent newspaper stories which typically represented them as exemplars of the urban working classes for middle-class readers.

Labor actions and strikes

Newsboys struck for better pay and working conditions multiple times: 1884, 1886, 1887, 1889, and in May 1898.

In the newsboys' strike of July 1899, many New York newsboys refused to deliver major newspapers, and asked the public to boycott them. The press run of Joseph Pulitzer's World fell by nearly two-thirds. After two hectic weeks, the papers capitulated. After a two-week strike, papers did not lower their prices, but did agree to buy back all unsold papers, and the union disbanded.

The New York newsboys' strike of 1899 inspired later strikes, including the Butte, Montana, Newsboys Strike of 1914, and a 1920s strike in Louisville, Kentucky. Chicago newsboys faced an uphill battle to gain better incomes, particularly during the 1912 media strike. Attempts to unionize were sporadic and undercut by intimidation and sometimes violent counter-responses by the publishers.
 
According to Jon Bekken:
Documented newsboy strikes took place in Boston (1901, 1908); Chicago (1912); Cleveland (1934); Des Moines (1922); Detroit (1877); Kansas City, Kansas (1947); Lexington, Kentucky (1899); Minneapolis (1918); Mobile (1942); New York City (1886, 1890, 1893, 1898, 1899, 1908, 1918, 1922, 1941, 1948); Oakland (1928); Portland, Oregon (1914); St. Louis (1945); San Jose, California (2000); and Seattle (1917).

During 1933 to 1935, the New Deal agency, the National Recovery Administration (NRA), promulgated a newspaper industry code that restricted juvenile employment in order to help unemployed adults. The restrictions expired when the Supreme Court in 1935 struck down the NRA as unconstitutional.

Images

American photographer Lewis Hine crusaded against child labor in America in the early 20th century by taking photographs that exposed frightful conditions, especially in factories and coal mines.  He photographed youths who worked in the  streets as well, but his photographs of them did not depict another appalling form of dangerous child labor or immigrant poverty, for they were not employees. There were working on their own as independent young entrepreneurs and Hine captures the image of comradeship,  youthful masculinity and emerging entrepreneurship.  The symbolic newsboy became an iconic image in discourses about childhood, ambition and independence.

Recent developments
In Wales, it was announced in July 2011 that Media Wales, publisher of the Western Mail and South Wales Echo, would no longer employ newspaper vendors in Cardiff city center. A spokesman said distribution of the newspaper by the vendors cost more than the newspaper received in return.

See also
 Newsboys' strike of 1899 in New York City
 Newsboy cap, a kind of hat worn by newsboys
 Newsboy Legion, a comic-book kid gang
 Newsies, a Disney movie and musical play based on the 1899 strike

Notes

Further reading
 
 Austin, Hilary Mac, and Kathleen Thompson. "Historical Thinking: Examining a Photo of Newsboys in Summer, 1908." Social Studies and the Young Learner 27.2 (2014): 29-33. online
 Bekken, Jon. "Newsboy Strikes." in Encyclopedia of Strikes in American History (2009): 609-619. online
  Bergel, Martín. "De canillitas a militantes. Los niños y la circulación de materiales impresos en el proceso de popularización del Partido Aprista Peruano (1930-1945)." ['From canillitas to militants. Children and the circulation of printed materials in the process of popularization of the Peruvian Aprista Party (1930-1945)'] Iberoamericana America Latina-Espana-Portuga. (2015), Vol. 15 Issue 60, pp 101–115.
 Burgan,  Michael. The American Newsboy, (2006), 48pp; written for children ages 9–11
 DiGirolamo, Vincent. Crying the News: A History of America's Newsboys (New York: Oxford University Press, 2019).
 DiGirolamo, Vincent. "Newsboy funerals: Tales of sorrow and solidarity in urban America." Journal of Social History 36.1 (2002): 5-30. online
 
 
 Gunckel, John Elstner. Boyville: A History of Fifteen Years' Work Among Newsboys (1905), a primary source online .
Hayes, Kevin J. “Railway Reading.” Proceedings of the American Antiquarian Society 106, no. 2 (1996): 301.  
 Hexter, Maurice Beck. The Newsboys of Cincinnati (1919) .  Argues they are delinquents and should be replaced by wounded war veterans. online
 Lee, Alfred McClung. The Daily Newspaper in America  (1936) pp 287–300, 784 online
 Linder, Marc. "From Street Urchins to Little Merchants: The Juridical Transvaluation of Child Newspaper Carriers." Temple Law Review 63 (1990): 829+.  with many citations to primary sources to  online
 

 Nasaw, Children of the City: At  Work and at Play  (1954) pp   48–61, 167-77. online free to borrow
 Postol, Todd A. "Hearing the Voices of Working Children," Labor's Heritage (Sept 1989) 1#3:4-19
 
 Postol, Todd A. "Masculine Guidance: Boys, Men, and Newspapers, 1930–1939." Enterprise & Society 1.2 (2000): 355-390.
 Postol, Todd A. "America's press‐radio rivalry: Circulation managers and newspaper boys during the depression." Media History 3.1-2 (1995): 155-166.
 Postol, Todd Alexander. "Creating the American paper boy: Circulation managers and middle-class route service in Depression-era America." (PhD dissertation, U of Chicago 1998) 
 Reed, Anna Y. Newsboy Service: A study in Educational and Vocational Guidance (Yonkers-on-Hudson World Book Co, 1917), online
 
 Staller, Karen M. New York's Newsboys: Charles Loring Brace and the Founding of the Children's Aid Society (Oxford UP, 2020).
Walbank, Alan. 1960. “Railway Reading.” The Book Collector. 9 no.3 (Autumn): 285-291.
 
 Zelizer, Viviana A. Pricing the priceless child: The changing social value of children (Princeton UP, 1994) pp 79–82. 
 "The Newsboys of Denver" Social Forces 4#2 (December 1925), pp. 330-336 in HEINONLINE.

Newspaper distribution
Child labour
Child labor in the United States